Armatlu may refer to:
 Armatlu, East Azerbaijan
 Armatlu, North Khorasan